IPDS may refer to:

 IBM Intelligent Printer Data Stream
 Infrasonic passive differential spectroscopy